Point No Point is an outcropping of land on the northeast point of the Kitsap Peninsula in Washington, the United States. It was the location of the signing of the Point No Point Treaty and is the site of the Point No Point Light. It was named by Charles Wilkes during the United States Exploring Expedition of Puget Sound in 1841.

Wilkes gave the point its name because it appears much less of a promontory at close range than it does from a distance. Point No Point has been noted for its unusual place name.

The marine climate ensures plenty of precipitation in winter and mild temperatures in summer. There are many productive habitats. The spit itself has sandy beaches with log jams, as well as some man-made structures for boating. Behind the beaches is a large mixed freshwater/saltwater marsh with a substantial shrub component.  The waters surrounding the point react to swiftly running tides, attracting many marine bird species. And there is a somewhat sheltered bay as well.

Birdwatching
Point No Point has one of the largest birdlists of any site in Washington. The point is owned jointly by the U.S. Coast Guard (leased to Kitsap County) and a private landowner who is knowledgeable and sympathetic to birdwatchers.

Point No Point is best known for its water-related species: gulls, cormorants, loons, terns, jaegers, ducks, grebes, mergansers, scoters, brant, and alcids. When the tide is running, there are flocks of Bonaparte's gulls and seabirds, often a veritable feeding frenzy. Jaegers are often seen flying through the gull and (in fall) tern flocks. Ancient murrelets can be seen offshore in November – this is one of the best sites in Washington for this species. Along the sandy beaches, shorebirds can be seen. The marsh attracts a variety of passerines, particularly in migration. Point No Point has produced many notable rarities, both in the offshore waters and in the marsh.

References

Landforms of Kitsap County, Washington
No Point
Landforms of Puget Sound
Birdwatching sites in the United States
Tourist attractions in Kitsap County, Washington